Kim Schuster is a fictional character on the television drama Peyton Place. She was portrayed in 33 episodes by Kimberly Beck, between 1965 and 1966.

Character history
Kim is the six-year-old deaf daughter of David Schuster (William Smithers) and his wife Doris Schuster (Gail Kobe). She is very fond of her father, who is often at work and doesn't see her much. However, she doesn't like her mother, blaming her for having moved from New York City to Peyton Place. She often ignores her attempts to bond with her and feels she doesn't love her as much because of her hearing impairment. It is implied her rebelliousness against her mother is actually a cry for attention, as she also steals to get attention.

David at one point thinks it was a mistake for having come to Peyton Place. In New York, she had her own private teacher, Amy Warren, but after arriving in the small town, she refused to talk. Doris suggests she be sent to a reform school in Boston. She is shocked and decides to run away, but Allison MacKenzie (Mia Farrow) soon finds her. They bond and Allison becomes her babysitter. This upsets Doris very much, because she wants to have the same relationship with Kim as Allison has. Besides Allison, she doesn't bond with many girls. The girls from her own age bully her for being different.

One night, Kim runs away for a second time and witnesses Rodney Harrington (Ryan O'Neal) and Joe Chernak fighting. Joe eventually dies the same night. A long murder trial follows and Kim has to be called to the witness stand. This upsets her very much, because the events of that night have become very traumatic for her. Doris notices Peyton Place is becoming too much for Kim and decides to leave with her for New York.

References

Peyton Place characters
Fictional deaf characters
Child characters in television
Literary characters introduced in 1965